2016 Regional League Division 2 Western  Region is the 4th season of the League competition since its establishment in 2013. It is in the third tier of the Thai football league system.

Changes from last season

Break zone clubs

Nonthaburi, Krung Thonburi, Globlex, Ratchaphruek College, Thonburi City, Samut Sakhon, Hua Hin City and Simork are broken from Central & Western Region

Team changes

Promoted clubs

No club was promoted to the Thai Division 1 League. Last years league champions Samut Sakhon and runners up Thonburi City failed to qualify from the 2015 Regional League Division 2 championsleague round.

Returning clubs

Muangkan United is returning to the league after a 1-year break.

Relocated clubs

Assumption United  re-located to the Regional League West Division from the Bangkok Area Division 2015.
Chumphon  re-located to the Regional League West Division from the South Division 2015.
Grakcu Tabfah Pathum Thani were moved to the Bangkok Region.
PTU Pathum Thani Seeker were moved to the Central Region.
Raj Pracha were moved to the Bangkok & Eastern Region.

Renamed clubs

Ratchaphruek Muengnon United renamed Ratchaphruek College again.
Globlex TWD renamed BTU United

Withdrawn clubs

Phetchaburi have withdrawn from the 2016 campaign.

Expansion clubs

IPE Samut Sakhon Promoted from Khǒr Royal Cup (ถ้วย ข.)  2015 Champion

Stadium and locations

League table

Results

Season statistics

Top scorers
As of 4 September 2016.

References

External links
Division 2

Thai League T4 seasons
3